Echinomacrurus is a genus of rattails.

Species
There are currently two recognized species in this genus:
 Echinomacrurus mollis Roule, 1916
 Echinomacrurus occidentalis Iwamoto, 1979

References

Macrouridae
Marine fish genera
Taxa named by Louis Roule